Keepin It Real is the third and final studio album from Savannah, Georgia rapper, Camoflauge, before his death. It features Micnificent, T. Waters, HVP, Roam, Baby from the Big Tymers and Luc Duc of The Iconz.

Track listing
 KILL 187 FM (intro) 
 Down By The River 
 Food Stamps Welfare (featuring HVP)
 Strictly 4 Da Streets (featuring T. Waters)
 Mind On My Mail 
 Layin My Stunt Down (featuring Baby (rapper) from Big Tymers)
 In Love With A Thug 
 Wanna Know Y
 Hot Grits (featuring Micnificent)
 All Eyes 
 Ghetto 
 Hustlin & Thuggin Daily  (featuring HVP)
 Free CD (skit) 
 Hey Hoe 
 Too Much Junk In You Trunk (interlude) 
 Bumpin My Sh*t 
 Bring It On (featuring Roam)
 Professional (featuring Luc Duc of The Iconz)
 Drama (remix)
 All Da Real Ni**az (outro) 
 ROAM (snippets)

2002 albums